Clifford's Puppy Days is an animated children's television series that originally aired on PBS Kids from September 1, 2003 to February 25, 2006. The prequel to the 2000–2003 series Clifford the Big Red Dog, it features the adventures of Clifford during his puppy days before he became a big red dog and before moving to Birdwell Island.

The series ended in February 2006 after two seasons and 39 episodes. Since then, occasional reruns continued to air, typically on holidays such as Halloween and Christmas, until April 2022.

In the United Kingdom, the series aired on CBeebies until early 2011 and like the original series, the prequel was dubbed with British voice actors, replacing the original American soundtrack.

The show featured Henry Winkler as the voice of Norville; Winkler was nominated for 2 Daytime Emmy Awards for Outstanding Performer in an Animated Program for his work on the series and he won in 2005.

Setting
Set two years before the events of Clifford the Big Red Dog, the series focuses on when Clifford was a tiny red puppy. Clifford was the runt in a litter of puppies born to by the pet dog of Emily Elizabeth's neighbor, Mr. Bradley (who appeared in an episode of the previous cartoon series, "Little Clifford"). He was adopted by Emily Elizabeth before he grew up into a giant red adult dog, forcing the Howard family to move out of their small apartment so Clifford would be able to live comfortably. The series shows Clifford and Emily Elizabeth's life and friends before they moved from the city to Birdwell Island.

Format
The series followed the same format as its predecessor, Clifford the Big Red Dog.

 The opening theme is followed by one central story, which is sometimes about Clifford and his friends.
 Storytime with Speckle – Between the first and second story, Emily-Elizabeth reads Clifford a Speckle Story, a short 60-second (approximately) time filler about a fictional dog (Speckle) and his animal friends Darnell, Reba, Ravi, and Luna.
 This is followed by another central story, sometimes about Emily-Elizabeth and her friends.
 Clifford's Idea to Grow On – Before the credits, another 30-second short takes place called Clifford's Idea to Grow On. The short is basically an animation of an etiquette, a proverb, or basic truth such as "Play Fair", "Help Others", etc., with narration by Emily-Elizabeth. This short was called Clifford's Big Idea in the previous series.
Live action segments with real kids and their dogs.
 
Like the original series, on UK airings, only one story is shown, with either the Storytime with Speckle or the Clifford's Idea to Grow On segments at the end, shortening the show to about 15 minutes.

Characters

Humans
Emily Elizabeth Howard (voiced by Grey DeLisle in the US version and Joanna Ruiz in the British version) is a 6-year-old owner of Clifford and Daffodil.
Nina Flores (voiced by Masiela Lusha) – owner of Jorge.
Evan Thomas Taylor (voiced by Orlando Brown) is a boy who looks a few years older than Emily Elizabeth.
Shun (voiced by Lauren Tom; Ben Small in the British version) is a young Japanese-American boy.
Mr. Solomon (voiced by Alan Oppenheimer) is a writer who uses a wheelchair. Flo and Zo are his two pet kittens. In the episodes "The Big, Big Present/Hanukkah Plunder Blunder," it is revealed that he, Flo, and Zo are Jewish.
Mrs. Z (voiced by Russi Taylor) is an elderly Italian woman who was once in the circus, and owner of Trixie.
Jenny (voiced by Dionne Quan) is a blind girl and owner of Bebe.
Vanessa (voiced by LaTonya Holmes) is a girl who first appears in the first season episode Keeping Cool. She also appeared in the second season episode Celebrating Spring.

Animals
Clifford (voiced by Lara Jill Miller in the US version and Lizzie Waterworth in the British version) is a small red puppy. His owner is Emily Elizabeth Howard and the younger adoptive brother of Daffodil.
Daffodil (voiced by Kath Soucie) is a Holland Lop. In the first half of the series she was originally pink but her fur was changed to white in the second half; she is also the adoptive big sister of Clifford.
Flo and Zo (voiced by LaTonya Holmes and Ogie Banks, respectively) are kittens who are brother and sister, they are owned by Mr. Solomon. In the episodes "The Big, Big Present/Hanukkah Plunder Blunder," it is revealed that they and Mr. Solomon are Jewish.
The Sidarskis are a family of mice who live in the laundromat. They have five children, Lucy, Lewis, Sophie, Sid, and a new baby.
Jorge/George (UK) (voiced by Jess Harnell; Benjamin Small in the British version) is a brown dachshund whose owner is Nina.
Bebe (voiced by Jill Talley) is a Golden Retriever Seeing-eye dog, She belongs to a blind girl named Jenny.
Tricksie (voiced by Russi Taylor) is an elderly dog who once performed in the circus with her owner, Mrs. Z.
Norville (voiced by Henry Winkler; Tom Eastwood in the British version) is a bird.
Chereath (voiced by LaTonya Holmes) is a golden retriever puppy in the episode Your Secret Valentine. This was her first and only appearance.
Teacup (voiced by Lucy Liu) is a miniature, adult poodle who has spent most of her life in the pound, as shown in her only appearance in the episode "Adopt a Pup." She eventually gets adopted by an elderly woman who had always wanted a dog, but never had enough room in her apartment for a normal-sized one, which made Teacup a perfect choice for her.
Bobby (voiced by Philip Hayes) is a giant puppy of a really big breed that plays roughly.
Jack (voiced by Tara Strong) is a competitive puppy in a sandcastle contest, as he competes against Clifford and Jorge.

Episodes
Each half-hour episode was divided into 2 stories.

Season 1 (2003–2005)

Specials (2004–2005)

Season 2 (2005–2006)

Opening theme
The opening theme, "Love Makes Little Things Grow", was composed by Jared Faber and Emily Kapnek (creator of Nickelodeon's As Told by Ginger) and performed by Freedom Bremner.

References

External links
 
 
 

CBeebies
2000s American animated television series
2003 American television series debuts
2006 American television series endings
2000s British animated television series
2003 British television series debuts
2006 British television series endings
American children's animated comedy television series
American television series with live action and animation
British children's animated comedy television series
British television series with live action and animation
Animated television series about children
Animated television series about dogs
Animated preschool education television series
American prequel television series
American television shows based on children's books
American preschool education television series
British television shows based on children's books
British preschool education television series
2000s preschool education television series
English-language television shows
PBS Kids shows
PBS original programming
Television series by Splash Entertainment
Television series set in 1998
Television shows set in New York City
Child versions of cartoon characters
Clifford the Big Red Dog